Laetesia oceaniae is a species of sheet weaver found in the New Hebrides. It was described by Berland in 1938.

References

Linyphiidae
Spiders of Oceania
Spiders described in 1938